Neopolyptychus consimilis is a moth of the family Sphingidae. It is known from Savanna from southern Sudan to the Congo.

The wingspan is about 30 mm for males.

References

Neopolyptychus
Moths described in 1903
Insects of the Democratic Republic of the Congo
Fauna of the Central African Republic
Fauna of the Republic of the Congo
Insects of West Africa
Moths of Africa